Mardi Paws is a Mardi Gras procession in Covington, Louisiana dedicated to animal welfare.

History 
The Krewe of Mardi Paws is a nonprofit organization that was founded in 1994 by Denise Gutnisky as a small dog parade that raised funds for animal shelters, and began to have a different theme every year starting in 1999. The parade has become a large organization that has worked with many charities and animal rights organizations. The parade was born in Mandeville, but was moved to Downtown Covington in 2020. The parade is held during the typical Mardi Gras season,.

Although Bacchus was the first Mardi Gras krewe to have a celebrity appear as its monarch, Mardi Paws is the first dog parade to have a celebrity appear as its monarch. The first celebrity to walk in the parade as its King was Ian Somerhalder in 2014, who was born and raised in Covington, Louisiana.

The parade, typically held the first Sunday after Mardi Gras, was not able to roll in 2021 because of COVID-19, but they followed New Orleans in their idea to make "house floats," except the participants made "dog house floats." In 2022, the parade is scheduled to roll as usual, but the theme has not yet been decided.

Another event the organization has started is Mutts to Models, also held in Mandeville, where local personalities walk in a fashion show with their dog;  The Mystic Krewe of Mardi Paws has also put on several adoption events as well as smaller fundraising events such as Mutts & Moonshine, which benefited TADSAW, (Train a Dog, Save a Warrior), a charity based in Texas that works with veterans and service dogs. In 2020, they also hosted "Trunk or Treat," a Halloween costume contest benefitting the St. Tammany Parish Animal Shelter In October 2020, they hosted, "Mardi Paws Geauxs Pink" to help raise awareness for breast cancer.

Parade 
The Mystic Krewe of Mardi Paws rolls during the New Orleans Mardi Gras season, on the first Sunday after Fat Tuesday.

Parade Themes 

 1994 No Theme
 1995 No Theme
 1996 No Theme
 1997 No Theme
 1998 Where Y'at Dawlin'
 1999 Walk on the Wild Side!
 2000 Every Dog has its Day!
 2001 Dog-gone With The Wind
 2002 "PAWS"itively Patriotic!
 2003 Mardi Paws goes to HOWL-YWOOD!
 2004 Olympic Com"PAW"tition
 2005 Puppy Love
 2006 Year of the Dog
 2007 Mardi Paws Does Disney
 2008 It's a Dog's Life
 2009 Mardi Paws Tunes in to TV!
 2010 Around the World
 2011 Diggin' Louisiana
 2012 Mardi Paws Goes Bark in Time
 2013 Mardi Paws Gets Doggone Wet
 2014 Live from the Red Carpet
 2015 Mardi Paws Takes a Road Trip
 2016 Love is in the Hair
 2017 Under the Big Top
 2018 Fables, Fairy Tales & Nursery Rhymes
 2019 Super Paws
 2020 Beyond All Boundaries: Exploring Sea, Air & Space
 2021 Pups are "In the House"

Charities 

 Ian Somerhalder Foundation
 Scott's Wish
 St. Tammany Spay & Neuter
 Miracle League
 Children's Hospital
 TADSAW
 St. Tammany Parish Animal Shelter
Capital Area Animal Welfare Society
Take Paws Rescue
ONEHOPE Wine

References 

Parades in the United States
Animal welfare and rights in the United States
Mardi Gras
Annual events in Louisiana
Charity events in the United States
Covington, Louisiana